Robson Ernandes da Silva Junior (born 6 April 1993), simply known as Robson, is a Brazilian footballer who plays as a central defender for Portuguesa.

Club career
Born in São Bernardo do Campo, São Paulo, Robson represented São Caetano, Red Bull Brasil and Mirassol as a youth. After leaving the latter in the end of 2013, he joined União Suzano, and made his senior debut during the 2014 Campeonato Paulista Segunda Divisão.

Robson moved to Taubaté for the 2014 Copa Paulista, but signed for São José dos Campos ahead of the 2015 season. He was a regular starter for the latter, notably scoring in a city derby against São José EC.

On 21 August 2015, Robson was announced at Manthiqueira for the latter stages of the Paulista Segunda Divisão. He remained for the 2016 season, but left in June to join Cypriot Second Division side Othellos Athienou, on a two-year deal.

Robson returned to Brazil ahead of the 2018 campaign, and agreed to a contract with Juventus-SP. On 30 September 2020, he moved to Água Santa for the Copa Paulista.

Robson left Água Santa on 23 December 2020, after not renewing his contract, and signed for Pouso Alegre for the 2021 Campeonato Mineiro. He returned to his native state on 19 July 2021, after joining XV de Piracicaba.

On 1 July 2022, Robson was announced as the new signing of Portuguesa. On 26 October, he renewed his contract until the end of the 2023 Campeonato Paulista.

Career statistics

Honours
Água Santa
Campeonato Paulista Série A2: 2021

Portuguesa
Campeonato Paulista Série A2: 2022

References

1993 births
Living people
People from São Bernardo do Campo
Footballers from São Paulo (state)
Brazilian footballers
Association football defenders
União Suzano Atlético Clube players
Esporte Clube Taubaté players
Clube Atlético Juventus players
Clube Atlético Joseense players
Esporte Clube Água Santa players
Pouso Alegre Futebol Clube players
Esporte Clube XV de Novembro (Piracicaba) players
Associação Portuguesa de Desportos players
Cypriot Second Division players
Othellos Athienou F.C. players
Brazilian expatriate footballers
Brazilian expatriate sportspeople in Cyprus
Expatriate footballers in Cyprus